Leucosyrinx barashi is a species of sea snail, a marine gastropod mollusk in the family Pseudomelatomidae, the turrids and allies.

This is a taxon inquirendum.

Description

Distribution
This species occurs in the Mediterranean Sea off Israel.

References

 Nordsieck, Fritz. Die europäischen Meeres-Gehäuseschnecken (Prosobranchia): vom Eismeer bis Kapverden, Mittelmeer und Schwarzes Meer. Fischer, 1982.

External links
 

barashi
Gastropods described in 1982